Gonzalo Quiroga (born 25 February 1993) is an Argentine professional volleyball player, a former member of the Argentina national team. At the professional club level, he plays for GKS Katowice.

He has an older brother Rodrigo, who is also a volleyball player. They are both nephews of Raúl Quiroga, a bronze medallist at the Olympic Games Seoul 1988.

Sporting achievements

Youth national team
 2010  CSV U19 South American Championship
 2012  U23 Pan American Cup
 2014  CSV U23 South American Championship

Individual awards
 2010: CSV U19 South American Championship – Most Valuable Player
 2010: CSV U19 South American Championship – Best Receiver
 2014: CSV U23 South American Championship – Best Outside Hitter

References

External links

 Player profile at LegaVolley.it  
 Player profile at PlusLiga.pl   
 Player profile at Volleybox.net 

1993 births
Living people
People from San Juan, Argentina
Sportspeople from San Juan Province, Argentina
Argentine men's volleyball players
Volleyball players at the 2010 Summer Youth Olympics
Pan American Games medalists in volleyball
Pan American Games bronze medalists for Argentina
Volleyball players at the 2011 Pan American Games
Medalists at the 2011 Pan American Games
Argentine expatriate sportspeople in Italy
Expatriate volleyball players in Italy
Argentine expatriate sportspeople in Poland
Expatriate volleyball players in Poland
Argentine expatriate sportspeople in France
Expatriate volleyball players in France
UCLA Bruins men's volleyball players
GKS Katowice (volleyball) players
BKS Visła Bydgoszcz players
Outside hitters